Amalveor (meaning "great Amal"; 'Amal' appears to be the name of a river) is a hamlet in West Penwith, Cornwall, England, United Kingdom at . The hamlet is 3 miles (5 kilometres) south-west of St Ives. It is in the civil parish of Towednack.

A pair of gold bracelets were discovered at Amalveor Farm (about one mile due west of the church) on 11 December 1931 and were declared to be treasure trove. The bracelets were dated as middle Bronze Age (about 1000BC) and are now in the British Museum. To the west is Sperris Quoit.

References

Hamlets in Cornwall